Hume Township may refer to:

 Hume Township, Whiteside County, Illinois
 Hume Township, Michigan

Township name disambiguation pages